"Mamacita" is a song recorded in two languages (Korean and Japanese) by South Korean boy band Super Junior. The Korean version was released through SM Entertainment on August 29, 2014, while the Japanese version was released on December 17, 2014, by Avex Trax. In Japan, the single reached number-one on the weekly Oricon Singles Chart.

Background
In Japan, "Mamacita (Ayaya)" contained on the B-Side song named "Lunar Eclipse". The single was released in three different editions: CD-only, CD+DVD and E.L.F JAPAN version.

Track listing

Charts

Korean version

Weekly charts

Japanese version

Oricon

Accolades

Credits and personnel 
Credits adapted from album's liner notes.

Studio 
 SM Booming System – recording, mixing, digital editing
 Sonic Korea – mastering

Personnel 
 SM Entertainment – executive producer
 Lee Soo-man – producer
 Super Junior – vocals, background vocals
 Yoo Young-jin – Korean lyrics, composition, vocal directing, background vocals, recording, mixing, digital editing, music and sound supervisor
 Teddy Riley – composition, arrangement
 Hidenori Tanaka – Japanese lyrics 
 Lee Hyun-seung – composition, arrangement
 Dominique "DOM" Rodriguez – composition, arrangement
 Jason J. "JSOL" Lopez – composition
 Jeon Hoon – mastering

Release history

References 

Super Junior songs
Japanese-language songs
New jack swing songs
2014 singles
SM Entertainment singles
Avex Trax singles
2014 songs
Oricon Weekly number-one singles
Songs written by Yoo Young-jin
Songs written by Teddy Riley